Dieter Kaegi (born 1957) is a Swiss opera director.

Biography 
Kaegi was born in 1957 in Zurich, Switzerland, where he completed his primary and secondary education. In the 70s, he studied Musicology and German Literature in Zürich and Paris. Over the last 30 years, Kaegi has directed over 100 operas worldwide.

In 1980, Dieter Kaegi became assistant director at the Zurich Opera under Claus Helmut Drese who had been in charge of the opera house since 1975. In 1982, he became assistant to leading French opera director Jean-Pierre Ponnelle. During his time with Ponnelle, he worked on opera productions for the stage and film. TV productions included L'Italiana in Algeri (1986), two episodes of Live from the Metropolitan Opera Idomeneo (1983) and Le Nozze di Figaro (1985), Cardillac (1985) and Tristan und Isolde (1983).

From 1986, Kaegi joined the Deutsche Oper am Rhein as assistant before moving to the Opéra de Monte-Carlo in 1989 as production manager and personal assistant to the Director-General John Mordler. From 1990 until 1998, he worked as director of productions at the Festival d'Art Lyrique d'Aix-en-Provence.

In 1998, he was appointed Artistic Director of Opera Ireland in Dublin. In 2010, he co-founded Lismore Music Festival. In 2018, the festival changed its name to Blackwater Valley Opera Festival. Kaegi continues to be the event's artistic director.

In 2012, Dieter Kaegi took over the role of General Director of Theater und Orchester Biel Solothurn (TOBS) in Switzerland.

Honours
In 2008, Kaegi was presented the Order of Cavaliere by the Italian Government for his services to the arts and opera.

References
Notes

Sources
Irish Times
BZ Berner Zeitung
Irish Examiner,

External links

Chambre Professionelle des Directeurs d'Opera
Blackwater Valley Opera Festival

Artistic directors
1957 births
Living people
Swiss opera directors